Landgravine Christine Wilhelmine of Hesse-Homburg (30 June 1653, in Bingenheim – 16 May 1722, in Grabow) was a German noblewoman.

She was the eldest daughter of William Christoph, Landgrave of Hesse-Homburg and his first wife Sophia Eleonore of Hesse-Darmstadt.

Upon her marriage she becomes the Duchess of Mecklenburg-Grabow. Her great-grandson was Ivan VI of Russia.

Marriage and issue
On 28 May 1671 she married Frederick, Duke of Mecklenburg-Grabow, son of Adolf Frederick I, Duke of Mecklenburg and Marie Katharina of Brunswick-Dannenberg.  They had the following children:

 Frederick William I (28 March 1675 – 31 July 1713); married Sophie Charlotte of Hesse-Kassel (July 16, 1678 – May 30, 1749), daughter of Charles I, Landgrave of Hesse-Kassel; no children.
 Carl Leopold (26 November 1678 – 28 November 1747); married Tsarevna Catherine of Russia (sister of Empress Anna); their daughter was Grand Duchess Anna Leopoldovna of Russia, mother of Ivan VI of Russia.
 Christian Ludwig II (15 May 1683 – 30 May 1756); married his first cousin, Duchess Gustave Caroline of Mecklenburg-Strelitz; had five children.
 Sophie Louise (16 May 1685 – 29 July 1735); third wife of Frederick I of Prussia; no children.

1653 births
1722 deaths
House of Hesse-Homburg
Daughters of monarchs